The royal arms of Cambodia is the symbol of the Cambodian monarchy.  They have existed in some form close to the one depicted since the establishment of the independent Kingdom of Cambodia in 1953.  It is the symbol on the royal standard of the reigning monarch of Cambodia, currently King Norodom Sihamoni.

Description

A light blue shield with an Unalome Sign, the Khmer Version of the Aum Symbol, on top of the sword is placed on two ceremonial pedestalled platters (phan) and the laurel wreath superimposed on the Royal Order of Cambodia on the bottom. The shield is placed on the white mantle with golden fringes and the golden decorations on the bottom and was surmounted by the Royal Crown with the shining diamond emanating from the rays of light at the top of the crown. The shield is supported by the two royal animals are the Gajasingha (the lion with an elephant trunk)  to the left and the Rajasingha (the royal lion) to the right holding two royal five-tiered umbrellas (one on each side) standing on the blue ribbon with the words: "" (In Khmer, "Ruler of the Kingdom of Cambodia").

The two royal animals of the gajasingha and the rajasingha holding two royal five-tiered umbrellas representing the King and the Queen.

The Khmer-language phrase  on the banner beneath the royal arms translates to: preăh chau (royal or auspicious ruler) - krŏng (area, or in this case, kingdom) - Kămpŭchéa (Cambodia): "Ruler of the Kingdom of Cambodia".

History
The royal arms were discontinued with the overthrow of the monarchy in the Republican Era (1970–1975). They were restored for official use in 1993 with the reinstatement of the monarchy under HM Norodom Sihanouk.

Other arms were used during succeeding periods: Democratic Kampuchea (i.e., Khmer Rouge era: 1975-1979), the People's Republic of Kampuchea (1979–1989), and the State of Cambodia (1989–1993).

See also 

 Flag of Cambodia

References 

National symbols of Cambodia
Cambodian coats of arms
Cambodia
Cambodia
Cambodia